Kenneth Sidney Coates (16 September 1930 – 27 June 2010) was a British politician and writer. He chaired the Bertrand Russell Peace Foundation and edited The Spokesman, the BRPF magazine launched in March 1970. He was a Labour Party Member of the European Parliament from 1989 to 1998 until his expulsion, and then an independent member of GUE/NGL from 1998 to 1999.

Early years

Coates was born in Leek, Staffordshire and was brought up in Worthing, West Sussex. When called up for national service in 1948, Coates chose to become a coal miner rather than be conscripted into the British army to fight in the Malayan Emergency. He later won a scholarship in 1956 to the University of Nottingham and achieved a first in Sociology.

After the war, he joined the Communist Party of Great Britain but left following the breach between Joseph Stalin and Josip Broz Tito, whom he defended.  After the 1956 Soviet invasion of Hungary, Coates and Pat Jordan became the focal point of a group of Marxists with a developing interest in Trotskyism. After attending the fifth world congress of the Fourth International in 1958, of which they were very critical, Coates played a central role in founding the International Group, forerunner of the International Marxist Group.

Coates also played leading roles in the Bertrand Russell Peace Foundation (BRPF), the Institute for Workers' Control, and European Nuclear Disarmament. He contested Nottingham South in 1983, but lost by several thousand votes.

European Parliament 

From 1989 to 1998 he was a Labour Party member of the European Parliament, and spent five years as President of its Human Rights Subcommittee. In 1998 Coates was expelled from the Labour Party because he left the Party of European Socialists to join the European United Left/Nordic Green Left in the European Parliament, after criticising New Labour's move to the right.

It was while a member of the European Parliament that Coates was in contact with Vadim Zagladin, one of Mikhail Gorbachev's advisors, about the idea of a joint meeting between the European Parliament and the Supreme Soviet. Coates persuaded the European Parliament to explore the possibility of such a joint meeting, as a practical way of exploring Gorbachev's call for a ‘common European home’ and supporting his democratic reforms. Eduard Shevardnadze, the Soviet foreign minister, visited the European Parliament, and said he would be willing to be present at a joint meeting. Coates visited Zagladin in Moscow, who offered a four-point programme of stages for realisation of the Joint Special Session, as it came to be known.

Coates pioneered a number of initiatives to help focus the institutions of European civil society beginning with a very successful Pensioners’ Parliament, and also including a special Parliament of Disabled People, and two Europe-wide conferences of unemployed people. He strongly supported the Delors programme for full employment in Europe, and became rapporteur of the Parliament's Temporary Committee on Employment, which carried two major reports with almost unanimous support of the European Parliament.

Coates was the co-author, with Tony Topham, of the official history of the Transport and General Workers' Union, among numerous other books on poverty, political philosophy, democratic and humanistic socialism, social and economic issues, peace and disarmament as well as on democracy and human rights. His book The Case of Nikolai Bukharin (Nottingham: Spokesman, 1978) is regarded by some to have served as the international basis for the rehabilitation of that Bolshevik leader. He also continued to support the democratic left in Eastern Europe, and was a member of the advisory board of the Novi Plamen magazine.

Coates was special professor in the Department of Adult Education at the University of Nottingham (1990–2004).

Books written or co-written 

St Ann's: Poverty, deprivation and morale in a Nottingham Community, with Richard Silburn, University of Nottingham, 1967 & Spokesman 2007
Industrial Democracy in Great Britain, with Tony Topham, MacGibbon & Kee, 1967
The Dirty War in Mr. Wilson, Vietnam Solidarity Campaign, 1967
Workers' Control: A Book of Readings and Witnesses for Workers' Control, McGibbon and Kee 1968
A Future for British Socialism?, Editor, Centre for Socialist Education, 1968
Can the workers run industry?, Editor, Sphere, 1968
Czechoslovakia and Socialism, Editor, Bertrand Russell Peace Foundation, 1969
How and Why Industry Must Be Democratised, with Wyn Williams, Institute for Workers' Control, 1969
The Debate on Workers' Control, Editor and Contributor, Institute for Workers' Control, 1970
Poverty: The Forgotten Englishmen, Penguin Books 1970 & Spokesman Books 2007
The Crisis of British Socialism, Spokesman Books 1971 
Prevent the Crime of Silence, Editor, Allen Lane, 1971
Essays on Industrial Democracy, Spokesman Books, 1971
Essays on Socialist Humanism, Editor, Spokesman, 1971
The New Unionism: the case for worker's control, with Tony Topham, Penguin Books, 1974.  
Socialism and the Environment, Editor, Spokesman, 1972
Detente and Socialist Democracy, Editor, Spokesman, 1975
Beyond Wage Slavery, Spokesman, 1977
Democracy in the Labour Party, Spokesman, 1977
The Shop Stewards' Guide to the Bullock Report, with Tony Topham, Spokesman, 1977
The Just Society, Edited with Fred Singleton, Spokesman, 1977
The Right to Useful Work, Editor, with Mike Cooley Spokesman, 1977
The Case of Nikoli Bukharin, Spokesman, 1978
What Went Wrong, Editor, Spokesman, 1979
Trade Unions in Britain, with Tony Topham, Spokesman, 1980 & Fontana Press, 1988
Beyond the Bulldozer, with Richard Silburn, University of Nottingham, 1980 & , Spokesman 1987
How to Win, Editor, Spokesman, 1981
Work-ins, Sit-ins and Industrial Democracy, Spokesman, 1981
Eleventh Hour for Europe, Editor, Spokesman, 1981
Heresies, Spokesman, 1982
The Social Democrats: Those who went and those who stayed, Spokesman 1983
The Most Dangerous Decade, Spokesman 1984
Trade unions and politics, with Tony Topham, Basil Blackwell, Oxford, 1986
China and the Bomb, Spokesman 1986
Joint Action for Jobs, A New Internationalism, Editor, Spokesman 1986
Perestroika: Global Challenge, Editor, Spokesman 1988
Think Globally, Act Locally, Spokesman 1988
The History of the Transport and General Workers' Union, with Tony Topham, Basil Blackwell 1991 & Spokesman 1994
Human Rights in the World, Spokesman 1992
A European Recovery Programme: Restoring Full Employment, Edited with Michael Barratt Brown, Spokesman 1993
Common Ownership: Clause Four and the Labour Party, Spokesman 1995
The Right to Work: The Loss of Our First Freedom, Editor, Spokesman 1995
Full Employment for Europe, with Stuart Holland, Spokesman 1995
Dear Commissioner, Spokesman 1996
The Blair Revelation: Deliverance for whom?, with Michael Barratt Brown, Spokesman 1996
Community Under Attack, with Michael Barratt Brown, Spokesman 1997
Full Employment: A European Appeal, Spokesman 1998
Workers' Control: Another World Is Possible, Spokesman Books 2003
Empire no more, Spokesman Books 2004

References

External links
 A Political Life (Coates interview)
 Lifelong Comrade (reflections by John Daniels)
 Tributes to Coates published in The Spokesman
 Obituary in the Telegraph
 Obituary in the Guardian
 Stan Newens obituary in the Independent
 Giles Oakley obituary in the Independent

1930 births
2010 deaths
Academics of the University of Nottingham
British anti-war activists
British anti–nuclear weapons activists
20th-century British writers
21st-century British writers
Scottish Socialist Party MEPs
British humanists
British Marxists
British Trotskyists
International Marxist Group members
Communist Party of Great Britain members
Labour Party (UK) MEPs
People from Leek, Staffordshire
MEPs for England 1989–1994
MEPs for England 1994–1999
Labour Party (UK) parliamentary candidates
People from Worthing
Politicians from Staffordshire
British political party founders